Vafr-e Jin (also Romanized as Vafr-e Jīn) is a village in Alvandkuh-e Gharbi Rural District, in the Central District of Hamadan County, Hamadan Province, Iran. At the 2006 census, its population was 1,445, in 392 families.

References 

Populated places in Hamadan County